Wyoming Highway 436 (WYO 436) is a  Wyoming state road in located in northeastern Washakie county.

Route description
Wyoming Highway 436 begins its southern end at Washakie CR 56. Highway 436 proceeds north for 5.93 miles until reaching its northern terminus at US Route 16, approximately 3.5 miles east of Ten Sleep.

Major intersections

References

External links 

Wyoming State Routes 400-499
WYO 436 - US 16 to Washakie CR 56

Transportation in Washakie County, Wyoming
436